CHMX-FM (92.1 MHz, Play 92) is a radio station in Regina, Saskatchewan. Owned by Harvard Media, it broadcasts a rhythmic adult contemporary format.

History 
The station was launched on February 4, 1966 by Metropolitan Broadcasting with the call sign CFMQ. It was acquired by Buffalo Broadcasting in 1974 and by Harvard Broadcasting, its current owner, in 1981. In 1994, it flipped to country as Country 92, airing a "new country" format to flank sister station CKRM. In 1999, the station flipped to a CHR format as Kiss 92. In 2001, it flipped to soft adult contemporary as Lite 92. On August 3, 2011, it flipped to mainstream adult contemporary as My 92.1.

On September 4, 2020, CHMX flipped to a rhythmic adult contemporary format as Play 92, featuring a focus on hit music from the 1990s and 2000s. Station management felt that the existing adult contemporary format's growth potential was limited, and that the new format filled a niche not yet covered by existing stations in the market. The success of the "Play" format at sister station CKPW-FM in Edmonton was also cited as a factor.

References

External links
 Play 92
 

HMX
HMX
Rhythmic adult contemporary radio stations
Radio stations established in 1966
1996 establishments in Saskatchewan